Chevelle may refer to:

Chevrolet Chevelle, mid-sized automobile produced by General Motors from 1963 to 1977
Chevelle (band), American metal band
The Chevelles, Australian pop band

People
Chevelle Brooks, Miss Continental Plus 2002
Chevelle Franklyn (born 1974), Jamaican reggae and gospel singer
Chevelle Hallback  (born 1971), American boxer

See also
Chevette (disambiguation)